Anthony Biekman (born 16 May 1994) is a Dutch footballer who plays as a forward.

Club career
He formerly played for FC Den Bosch, for whom he scored on his debut in February 2013, RKC Waalwijk and FC Dordrecht. In summer 2015 he left Dordrecht to pursue a career abroad, but he ended up at Tweede Divisie side Katwijk.

In June 2020, Biekman joined VCS from The Hague after having played for BVV Barendrecht the season before.

References

External links

1994 births
Living people
Footballers from Zoetermeer
Dutch sportspeople of Surinamese descent
Association football forwards
Dutch footballers
Excelsior Rotterdam players
Sparta Rotterdam players
FC Den Bosch players
RKC Waalwijk players
FC Dordrecht players
VV Katwijk players
BVV Barendrecht players
Eredivisie players
Eerste Divisie players
Tweede Divisie players
Derde Divisie players